Bogić Vujošević (born 5 August 1992) is a Serbian–Austrian professional basketball player for Vienna of the Austrian Basketball Superliga. He represents the Austria national team internationally.

Professional career 
Vujošević played for Novi Sad, Vojvodina Srbijagas, Radnički Beograd, and Crnokosa in Serbia.

In 2014, he moved to Austria where he played for Oberwart Gunners, Vienna, and Kapfenberg Bulls.

Vujošević played for Okapi Aalst of the Belgian Pro Basketball League during the 2020–21 season.

In September 2021, Vujošević returned to Vienna.

National team career 
In August 2008, Vujošević was a member of the Serbia U16 national team that finished the fifth at the FIBA Europe Under-16 Championship in Chieti, Italy. Over five tournament games, he averaged 2.2 points and four rebounds per game. In July/August 2010, Vujošević was a member of the Serbia under-18 national team that finished the fourth at the FIBA Europe Under-18 Championship in Vilnius, Lithuania. Over nine tournament games, he averaged 6.6 points, three rebounds, and 2.7 assists per game. In June/July 2011, Vujošević was a member of the Serbia U19 national team that won a silver medal at the FIBA Under-19 Basketball World Cup in Latvia. Over nine tournament games, he averaged 8.0 points, 1.3 rebounds, and 1.6 assists per game.

Vujošević was a member of the Austria national team at the EuroBasket 2022 qualification and the EuroBasket 2025 qualification.

Career achievements and awards 
 Austrian Bundesliga / Austrian Superliga champion: 4  (with Kapfenberg Bulls: 2016–17, 2017–18, 2018–19; with Vienna: 2021–22)
 Austrian Cup winner: 4  (with Kapfenberg Bulls: 2017, 2018, 2019, 2020)
 Austrian Basketball Supercup winner: 5  (with Vienna: 2015; with Kapfenberg Bulls: 2017, 2018, 2019, 2020)

Individual awards
 Austrian Bundesliga Finals MVP (2) – 2017, 2018
 Austrian Superliga Finals MVP – 2022
 Austrian Cup MVP (2) – 2017, 2018

References

External links 
 Bogic Vujosevic at FIBA
 Profile at eurobasket.com
 Player Profile at realgm.com
 Bogic Vujosevic at proballers.com

1992 births
Living people
Austrian expatriate basketball people in Serbia
Austrian men's basketball players
Austrian people of Serbian descent
Basketball League of Serbia players
BC Zepter Vienna players
BKK Radnički players
Kapfenberg Bulls players
KK Crnokosa players
KK Novi Sad players
KK Vojvodina Srbijagas players
Naturalised citizens of Austria
Okapi Aalstar players
People from Vrbas, Serbia
Point guards
Serbian expatriate basketball people in Austria
Serbian expatriate basketball people in Belgium
Serbian men's basketball players
Traiskirchen Lions players